José Mario Wong Pérez (25 November 1951 15 September 2015) was a Mexican politician affiliated with the Institutional Revolutionary Party. He served as a Deputy of the LIX Legislature of the Mexican Congress (2003–2006) representing Chihuahua.

References

1951 births
2015 deaths
Politicians from Chihuahua (state)
Institutional Revolutionary Party politicians
21st-century Mexican politicians
Members of the Congress of Chihuahua
Municipal presidents in Chihuahua (state)
20th-century Mexican politicians
People from Nuevo Casas Grandes Municipality
Members of the Chamber of Deputies (Mexico) for Chihuahua (state)